Jan Chełmiński, also known as Jan van Chelminski, born Jan Władysław Chełmiński (Brzustów, 27 January 1851 – 1925), was a Polish painter.

Life
Chełmiński entered the Munich Academy of Fine Arts on 14 April 1875 (Register: 3144) and worked throughout Europe. From 1895 he lived in New York, though in 1893 he had taken out British citizenship.

He married twice. After divorcing his first wife, Marie Henschel (1858–?), he married Leonie Knoedler, sister of Roland Knoedler, of the famous New York art dealership, Knoedler.

Chełmiński was best known in his lifetime for his historical works, especially those dealing with military history and the Napoleonic Wars.

See also
 List of Poles

References

External links

 
 Works online
 Jan Chełmiński, biography at the Kosciuszko Foundation(Wayback Machine)
 Jan Chełmiński extensive biography, birth certificate, his paintings]
Jan Chełmiński exhibition catalogs
 portrait of Jan Chelminsk(Minnesota Historical Society)

1851 births
1925 deaths
19th-century Polish painters
19th-century Polish male artists
20th-century Polish painters
20th-century Polish male artists
19th-century painters of historical subjects
Academy of Fine Arts, Munich alumni
Polish male painters